The following is the complete filmography of American actor Martin Sheen.

Film

Documentaries

Television

Video games

Podcasts and radio

References

American filmographies
Male actor filmographies